Browning machine guns are a family of machine gun designs by John Browning, a prolific weapon designer.

These include:

M1895 Colt–Browning machine gun, based on a design dating to 1889, was the first successful gas-operated machine gun to enter service.
M1917 Browning machine gun, a family of water-cooled machine guns in .30-'06
M1918 Browning Automatic Rifle, or its variants
M1919 Browning machine gun, a family of air-cooled machine guns in .30-'06
M1921 Browning machine gun, a family of water-cooled machine guns in .50 BMG
M2 Browning machine gun, a family of air-cooled machine guns in .50 BMG

A related term:

.50 BMG or .50 Browning Machine Gun, a large caliber machine gun round

References

Machine guns